The R151 or Baroiar Hat Pelagazi Dighi Road is a transportation artery in Bangladesh, which connects Baroiar Hat point of Dhaka–Chittagong Highway with Regional Highway R160 at Pelaghazi Dighi.

Junction list

The entire route is in Chittagong District.

Markets crossed
Baroiyar Hat Municipality
Karerhat
Balutila Bazar
Heyanko Bazar
Dantmara Bazar
Shantirhat
Narayanhat
Mirzarhat
Kazir Hat
Fakir Hat
Brindabon Hat
Pelaghazi Dighi

See also
N1 (Bangladesh)

References

Regional Highways in Bangladesh